Capua spilonoma is a species of moth of the family Tortricidae. It is found in Ethiopia and Uganda.

Subspecies
Capua spilonoma spilonoma (Ethiopia)
Capua spilonoma gitona Bradley, 1965 (Uganda)

References

Moths described in 1932
Capua (moth)